The 1996 Rothmans Malta Grand Prix was the third edition of the professional invitational snooker tournament, which took place from 8 to 13 October 1996. The tournament was played at the Jerma Palace Hotel in Marsaskala, Malta.

Nigel Bond won the title, defeating Tony Drago 7–3 in the final.

Main draw

References

Malta Grand Prix
Malta Grand Prix
Grand Prix
Malta Grand Prix